The Education of Elizabeth is a 1921 American silent comedy romance film produced by Famous Players-Lasky and distributed by Paramount Pictures. It was directed by Edward Dillon and stars stage star Billie Burke in her last silent film. The film was based on a play by Roy Horniman and is now a lost film.

Cast
 Billie Burke as Elizabeth Banks
Lumsden Hare as Thomas
Edith Sharpe as Lucy Fairfax
Donald Cameron as Harry
Frederick Burton as Middleton
Fredric March (uncredited extra)

References

External links

1921 films
American silent feature films
American films based on plays
Films directed by Edward Dillon
Lost American films
Famous Players-Lasky films
1921 romantic comedy films
American romantic comedy films
American black-and-white films
1920s American films
Silent romantic comedy films
Silent American comedy films